The Soviet Union's 1962 nuclear test series was a group of 78 nuclear tests conducted in 1962. These tests followed the Soviet Project K nuclear tests series and preceded the 1964 Soviet nuclear tests series.

References

1962
1962 in the Soviet Union
1962 in military history
Explosions in 1962